Communauté d'agglomération du Pays de Landerneau-Daoulas is the communauté d'agglomération, an intercommunal structure, centred on the town of Landerneau. It is located in the Finistère department, in the Brittany region, northwestern France. Created in 2009, its seat is in Landerneau. Its area is 371.4 km2. Its population was 49,030 in 2019, of which 15,918 in Landerneau proper.

Composition
The communauté d'agglomération consists of the following 22 communes:

Daoulas
Dirinon
La Forest-Landerneau
Hanvec
Hôpital-Camfrout
Irvillac
Landerneau
Lanneuffret
Logonna-Daoulas
Loperhet
La Martyre
Pencran
Ploudiry
Plouédern
La Roche-Maurice
Saint-Divy
Saint-Eloy
Saint-Thonan
Saint-Urbain
Tréflévénez
Le Tréhou
Trémaouézan

References

Landerneau
Landerneau